Type 10 is a main battle tank used by the Japan Ground Self-Defense Force.

Type 10 may also refer to:

 Type 10 grenade, a fragmentation hand grenade of the Imperial Japanese Army
 Type 10 grenade discharger, a World War II infantry mortar
 Type 10 and Type 3 rocket boosters, Japanese World War II rocket artillery systems
 Type 10 120 mm AA gun, a Japanese World War II gun
 Belgian State Railways Type 10, a class of steam locomotives built 1910–1914
 Bugatti Type 10, a prototype car 1908–1909
 Mitsubishi Navy Type 10 Carrier Attack Aircraft, a 1920s Japanese aircraft
 Mitsubishi Navy Type 10 Carrier Fighter, a 1920s Japanese aircraft
 Mitsubishi Navy Type 10 Carrier Reconnaissance Aircraft, a 1920s Japanese aircraft
 Peugeot Type 10, a car produced 1894–1896 
 Yokosuka Navy Type 10 Reconnaissance Seaplane, a 1920s Japanese aircraft
 QBU-10, also known as the Type 10 or Shin 10 rifle

See also

Type X (disambiguation)